Moeydeleh-ye Olya (also Romanized as Mo‘eydeleh-ye ‘Olyā; also known as Mo‘edeleh-ye ‘Olyā, Mollā Dāvod, and Mollā Dāvūd) is a village in Azadeh Rural District, Moshrageh District, Ramshir County, Khuzestan Province, Iran. At the 2006 census, its population was 33, in 8 families.

References 

Populated places in Ramshir County